The International Journal of Pharma and Bio Sciences is a quarterly scientific journal covering research in pharmaceutical and biological sciences. It was established in 2010 and the editor-in-chief is Guru Prasad Mohanta (Annamalai University).

The journal was placed on Jeffrey Beall's list of "Potential, possible, or probable" predatory scholarly open-access journals. Although the journal charges article processing fees, readers have to subscribe to the journal or buy articles individually.

Abstracting and indexing
The journal is abstracted and indexed in Chemical Abstracts Service and Embase.

From 2010 to 2014, and again in 2016, the journal was indexed in Scopus. Indexing was discontinued for "publication concerns".

References

External links

Quarterly journals
Publications established in 2010
English-language journals
Pharmacology journals
Biology journals